The 1981 Southeastern Conference baseball tournament was held at Dudy Noble Field in Starkville, Mississippi, from May 15 through 17.  won the tournament and earned the Southeastern Conference's automatic bid to the 1981 NCAA Tournament.

Regular season results

Tournament

All-Tournament Team

See also 
 College World Series
 NCAA Division I Baseball Championship
 Southeastern Conference baseball tournament

References 

2. SECSports.com All-Time Baseball Tournament Results
3. Boydsworld 1981 Standings
4. SECSports.com All-Tourney Team Lists

Tournament
Southeastern Conference Baseball Tournament
Southeastern Conference baseball tournament
Southeastern Conference baseball tournament
College sports tournaments in Mississippi
Baseball competitions in Mississippi
Sports in Starkville, Mississippi